Fulwell railway station on the Shepperton Branch Line serves Fulwell in the London Borough of Richmond upon Thames. It is in Travelcard Zone 6.

The station and all trains serving it are operated by South Western Railway.

History 

The Shepperton Branch or Thames Valley Line, opened on 1 November 1864, accessed from the Strawberry Hill direction only.  The original scheme intended that it would extend to a terminus on the Middlesex bank of the River Thames just east of Chertsey Bridge but this plan was abandoned in 1862.

The curve from Fulwell to Teddington opened to freight on 1 July 1894 and first carried passengers on 1 June 1901. The branch line was electrified on 30 January 1916 (at the same time as the Kingston Loop). Since a change under British Rail the large majority of Shepperton branch services have been routed via Kingston upon Thames, retaining additional peak hour services via Twickenham.

The station is expected to be a calling point of Crossrail 2.

Services 

The typical weekday hourly service at the station is:

2 trains to London Waterloo via Kingston and Clapham Junction
2 trains to 

Monday to Friday, four additional early morning rush-hour trains to Waterloo are routed via Twickenham and Richmond. Three additional evening rush-hour trains from Waterloo arrive via that route.

The Saturday service is as on other weekdays without the extra services routed via Twickenham. On Sundays the service is hourly.

Connections
London Buses routes 33, 267, 281, 481, R70, school route 681 and night routes N22 and N33 serve the station.

Notes and references
Notes

References

Further reading

External links 

Railway stations in the London Borough of Richmond upon Thames
Former London and South Western Railway stations
Railway stations in Great Britain opened in 1864
Railway stations served by South Western Railway
1864 establishments in England